Dirie is a Somali surname. Notable people with the surname include:
Ali Dirie (…–2013), Somali Canadian convicted on terrorism charges
Asha Gelle Dirie (born 1966), Somali politician and civil society activist
Waris Dirie (born 1965), Somali model, author, actress and social activist

See also 
D-Irie, rapper

References 

Somali-language surnames